Alundur  is a village in Srirangam taluk of Tiruchirappalli district in Tamil Nadu, India.

Demographics 

As per the 2001 census, Alundur had a population of 3,234 with 1,596 males and 1,638 females. The sex ratio was 1026 and the literacy rate, 51.4.

References 

 

Villages in Tiruchirappalli district